Métisse is an Irish/African soul/electronica band, formed by former Chapter House member Skully, and Aïda Bredou, a singer/choreographer from Côte d'Ivoire.  They formed in Toulouse, France.  The band's name is the French word for 'a girl or woman of mixed racial heritage', and its music is a mix of African, Celtic, soul and electronic music.  Song lyrics often feature a mixture of Dioula, English and French words.

The band achieved initial success with the single "Sousoundé". Its next hit, "Boom Boom Bâ" was the featured title track in Madonna's film The Next Best Thing and was played several times in the Showtime TV series Dead Like Me. It was also occasionally played as a bumper music song on the international radio program 'Coast to Coast AM', by founder Art Bell. In addition, "Nomah's Land" was played in the Dead Like Me second season episode "The Shallow End".

They released two new singles in 2013, "You Are Beautiful" and "I See People".

Métisse's music has been licensed for numerous television, film productions and advertising campaigns. They have two albums, My Fault and Nomah's Land, though their music has been licensed for several compilation discs.

Albums
My Fault (2000)
 Sousoundé
 Sadness
 Boom Boom Bâ
 CoCo
 Pray
 Fool Inside
 Azo Azo
 My Fault
 Walking Home
 Aicha
 Aliguiné

Nomah's Land (2007)
 Nomah's Land
 Life
 Lovers Game
 In A Way
 I Love You
 World Of Our Own
 The Rain Is Falling
 Journey To Oasis
 Take A Left
 Therapy

External links
 
 
  statistics, tagging and previews at Last.FM
 My Fault Album Info

Irish pop music groups
Irish electronic music groups
Ivorian musical groups
Musical groups from Cork (city)